Zachary Ryan Reininger (born January 28, 1993) is an American professional baseball pitcher who is a free agent. He has played in Major League Baseball (MLB) for the Detroit Tigers.

Career
Reininger attended Smithson Valley High School in Spring Branch, Texas.

Detroit Tigers
Reininger attended Hill College in Hillsboro, Texas and was drafted by the Detroit Tigers in the 8th round (246th overall) of the 2013 Major League Baseball draft. In 2015, Reininger suffered an elbow injury that required Tommy John surgery. As a result, Reininger missed the second half of the year in 2015 and the vast majority of the entire 2016 season.

On August 23, 2017, the Detroit Tigers announced the addition of Reininger to their 40-man roster and his subsequent call-up to the active roster effective the next day. At the time of his call-up, Reininger was pitching for Tigers' Triple-A affiliate, the Toledo Mud Hens, where he had a 1–0 record, 1.59 ERA, and held opponents to a .179 average in  innings of work. He made his Major League debut on August 27, 2017, where he struck out a man and gave up two runs on three hits and a walk in an inning of work. 
Reininger was again called up on May 8, 2018, to fill in for injured players. He made 18 appearances for the Tigers 2018, recording an ERA of 7.59 in  innings. At Toledo in 2018, he went 5–1 with a 2.63 ERA in  innings. Reininger was outrighted off the Tigers roster on October 23, 2019. He became a minor league free agent on November 7, 2019.

Oakland Athletics
On April 1, 2020, Reininger signed a minor league deal with the Oakland Athletics. He resigned on a minor league deal on November 2, 2020. He elected free agency on November 7, 2021.

Cleburne Railroaders
On August 1, 2022, Reininger signed with the Cleburne Railroaders of the Atlantic League of Professional Baseball. He was released on October 17, 2022.

References

External links

1993 births
Living people
Baseball players from San Antonio
Connecticut Tigers players
Detroit Tigers players
Erie SeaWolves players
Glendale Desert Dogs players
Gulf Coast Tigers players
Hill College Rebels baseball players
Lakeland Flying Tigers players
Major League Baseball pitchers
Midland RockHounds players
Toledo Mud Hens players
West Michigan Whitecaps players
American expatriate baseball players in Australia
Perth Heat players